"Music for Love" is a song from Mario's third studio album Go, which was released on December 11, 2007 and is the third official single. Mario announced on 106 & Park that "Music for Love" would be the third official single to be released in April 2008.

It first appeared on Billboard'''s Hot R&B/Hip-Hop Songs chart on the week of April 3 at number 100.

It was produced by Ralph B. Stacy and written by Theron Thomas, Timothy Thomas, Jerrod Stacy and Mario.

Critical reception
Andy Colleman from allmusic says "bearing a definite resemblance to J. Holiday's gently rocking and swaying "Bed"".

Aaron Fields from KSTW.com says "This is one of the standout beats on this album. Talk about bumpin' this is the one to bump right here. A nice mid-tempo track with much bass. You'll want to put this one on repeat. His voice sounds great on this track and the arrangement is on point once again".

Music video
Mario announced that he would be shooting the video for "Music for Love" and it was rumored that Karina Smirnoff of Dancing with the Stars'' would appear in the video. However, as of July 2008 there was still no news of a music video for the song. Later it was revealed that there would be no video for "Music For Love" since Mario was working on his fourth album titled D.N.A.

Track listing
Promo
"Music for Love" (Album version)
"Music for Love" (Instrumental)
"Music for Love" (Call Out Hook)

Charts

Weekly charts

Year-end charts

References

2008 singles
Mario (singer) songs
Songs written by Timothy Thomas
Songs written by Theron Thomas
2007 songs
J Records singles